Blair Michael Atcheynum (born April 20, 1969) is a Canadian former professional ice hockey right winger. Atcheynum from Sweetgrass First Nation is of Cree descent.

Playing career
Atcheynum was selected in the third round, 52nd overall, by the Hartford Whalers in the 1989 NHL Entry Draft after scoring 70 goals in 71 games with the Moose Jaw Warriors of the Western Hockey League during the 1988–89 season. He never reached the NHL with the Whalers and was later claimed by the new Ottawa Senators in the 1992 NHL Expansion Draft.

He spent the majority of his career in the minor leagues but was able to break into the NHL for a total of 196 games over four seasons. He got his first taste of the NHL during the 1992–93 NHL season when he played four games for the Ottawa Senators, although he spent the majority of the season with their farm team, the New Haven Senators of the American Hockey League. It would take another four years to make it as a regular in the NHL. He played in 61 games (scoring a respectable 11 goals and 15 assists) during the 1997–98 NHL season for the St. Louis Blues after signing with the team as a free agent.  The main reasoning behind Atcheynum being called up to the Blues during this period was due to the lack of depth on their roster early on in the 1997-98 season. With St. Louis, Atcheynum would typically play on a line with Craig Conroy and Scott Pellerin that was fondly referred to as the "CPA Line". Blues general manager Larry Pleau was impressed by Atcheynum's hard work, saying "Blair's not a player in the bottom third of our roster. He's one of our first nine forwards. He can move up to the first or second line without missing a step if we need him".

The next year he was selected in the 1998 NHL Expansion Draft by the newly formed Nashville Predators. He played 53 games with the Predators before being traded back to St. Louis for a sixth-round draft pick in the 2000 NHL Entry Draft. In 1999 he was signed as a free agent by the Chicago Blackhawks, with whom he played 66 games between 1999 and 2001. Atcheynum retired as a professional hockey player in 2001.

Atcheynum is currently an assistant coach with the Battlefords North Stars of the Saskatchewan Junior Hockey League Atcheynum is said to have been taking major strides with the North Stars program, as reports show that locals describe the North Stars level of play as "fast and intelligent hockey, free of buffoonery of the goon hockey that many people detest".  He was also most recently honoured at the 2012 First Nation Games, alongside Fred Sasakamoose, who was the first treaty Indian to play in the NHL.  Atcheynum and Sasakamoose were recognized as role models at both the summer and winter games as hope for young First Nations athletes.

Career statistics

Regular season and playoffs

Awards
 WHL East First All-Star Team – 1989

References

External links

1969 births
Binghamton Whalers players
Canadian ice hockey right wingers
Cape Breton Oilers players
Chicago Blackhawks players
Chicago Wolves (IHL) players
Columbus Chill players
Cree people
First Nations sportspeople
Hartford Whalers draft picks
Hershey Bears players
Ice hockey people from Saskatchewan
Living people
Minnesota Moose players
Moose Jaw Warriors players
Nashville Predators players
New Haven Senators players
Norfolk Admirals players
Ottawa Senators players
People from Estevan
Portland Pirates players
St. Louis Blues players
Saskatoon Blades players
Springfield Indians players
Swift Current Broncos players
Worcester IceCats players